Eddy Cael (born 24 October 1945) is a Belgian racing cyclist. He rode in the 1974 Tour de France.

References

External links
 

1945 births
Living people
Belgian male cyclists
Place of birth missing (living people)